is a Japanese manga series written by Riku Sanjo and illustrated by Koji Inada, based on the popular video game franchise Dragon Quest. It was serialized in Shueisha's Weekly Shōnen Jump from October 1989 to December 1996, with its chapters collected in 37 tankōbon volumes.

A prequel manga series began in V Jump in September 2020 and a spin-off manga began in Saikyō Jump in October 2020. The manga was adapted into an anime series, produced by Toei Animation and broadcast on TBS from July 1991 to July 1992. It is the second anime adaptation based on the Dragon Quest franchise after Dragon Quest: Legend of the Hero Abel. A second anime adaptation based on the manga premiered on TV Tokyo in October 2020 and aired till October 2022.

Dragon Quest: The Adventure of Dai is one of the Weekly Shōnen Jump'''s best-selling manga series of all time, with more than 47million copies in circulation.

Plot

The story begins with a young boy named Dai remembering a story told to him by his adoptive grandfather, the monster magician Brass, about the defeat of the Demon King Hadlar by the hands of a hero known as Avan. After the defeat of the Demon King Hadlar, all of the monsters were released from his evil will and peace reigned supreme around the world once again for ten years. Some monsters and demons moved to the island of Dermline to live in peace. Dai, the young protagonist of the series, is an orphan and the only human living on the island. Having been raised by Brass and with his best friend, the monster Gome, Dai grows up dreaming of becoming a hero.

After Dai befriends Leona, the princess of the Kingdom of Papnica and saves her from peril, Avan comes to the island accompanied by his apprentice, the magician Popp, to become Dai's teacher by her request. However, his training is interrupted by the return of Hadlar, who was resurrected by the Great Demon King Vearn and became the commander of his vast army. Avan sacrifices himself to protect his disciples and Hadlar is temporarily driven away by Dai after he awakens a mysterious power within himself.

To honor Avan's final request, Dai, Popp and Gome leave the island and begin their quest to defeat Hadlar and his master to bring peace back to the world. During their travels, Dai's party gains three other members; the healer Maam, who later becomes also a martial artist, Hyunckel, one of Hadlar's former subordinates and Leona herself. Their enemies include Beast King Crocodine, an honourable but ruthless commander of Hadlar's army, the Mystic legion commander Zaboara and his son Zamza, A magical elemental of Ice and Fire known as Flazzard, the illusive Mystvearn, who himself is a greater servant of Vearn and is Hyunkel's teacher of black magic, Killvearn, a jester who is Vearn's personal assassin and Baran, a legendary warrior and Dai's father who sided with Vearn after the death of his wife and the disappearance of his son.

Media
MangaDragon Quest: The Adventure of Dai is written by Riku Sanjo and illustrated by Koji Inada. A short story  was first published for two chapters in Shueisha's Weekly Shōnen Jump in June 1989. A short story, was published for three chapters in August 1989. Dragon Quest: The Adventure of Dai was serialized for seven years in Weekly Shōnen Jump from October 23, 1989, to December 9, 1996. The manga was collected into 37 tankōbon volumes published between March 9, 1990, and June 4, 1997. It was later released in 22 bunkobon volumes published from June 18, 2003, to March 18, 2004. A 25-volume edition that includes the color pages from its original magazine run and newly drawn covers by Inada was published between October 2, 2020, and July 2, 2021.

A prequel manga series, titled Dai no Daibōken: Yuusha Avan to Gokuen no Maou, illustrated by Yūsaku Shibata, with Sanjo credited for original work, began serializing in Shueisha's V Jump on September 19, 2020. The series is centered around Avan before he met Dai and his companions.

A spin-off manga written and illustrated by Yoshikazu Amami, titled Dragon Quest: The Adventure of Dai - Cross Blade, launched in the November issue of Shueisha's Saikyō Jump manga magazine on October 1, 2020.

On July 9, 2021, Viz Media announced they licensed the series for English publication, starting in March 2022.

Anime
First series (1991)

Produced by Toei Animation, the anime adaptation of Dragon Quest: The Adventure of Dai aired for 46 episodes on TBS from October 17, 1991 to September 24, 1992. Despite no official Japanese DVD release, the show reran in 2007 on Toei's channel with a new master. The series uses two pieces of theme music, both composed by Koichi Sugiyama and performed by Jirou Dan.  is used for the opening theme, while , which was the original ending theme for Dragon Quest II, is used for the episodes' ending theme. The series adapts the events of the first 10 volumes of the manga, with initial plans to continue onward until scheduling and time slot changes at TBS lead to the series ending after 46 episodes. To accommodate the abrupt ending, Sanjo helped to provide an adjusted finale to the anime.

On January 6, 2020, the whole series was released in Japan for distribution on several video on demand (VOD) services, the first time the series has become officially available after the VHS release of the 1990s. In March 2020 it was announced that the 1991 anime will be getting a Blu-ray Box for the first time, released on July 3, 2020. The set contained all 46 episodes, and the 3 Jump Festa short theatrical movies (including the first film never before released on home video), which have been scanned from their original 35 mm negatives with high resolution and recorded as high-quality full HD remastered images.

Films
Three short theatrical movies were produced based on the first TV series, all of which premiered at the Toei Anime Fair film festival.

Second series (2020)

It was announced during Jump Festa 2020 that there would be a new anime adaptation that would premiere in fall 2020. The anime was produced by Toei Animation and was a hybrid of 2D and CG animation. The series ran for 100 episodes, premiering on TV Tokyo and other affiliates on October 3, 2020. The series halted broadcast since March 12, 2022, when episode 73 was originally scheduled to air, and the series' entire schedule was subsequently delayed until further notice shortly after Toei Animation revealed their internal servers had been hacked by an unauthorized third party. The broadcast resumed on April 16, 2022, and finished on October 22 of the same year. The band Macaroni Empitsu performed the series' opening theme "Ikiru o Suru" and the series' ending theme "mother". XIIX performed the series' second ending theme "Akashi".  Muse Communication licensed the second series in Asia-Pacific, and is streaming the first 50 episodes on Netflix. Toei simulcasts the series with English subtitles in North America, Latin America, New Zealand, Africa, the Middle East and Europe via Crunchyroll, as well as Hulu in the United States and Anime Digital Network in France. Originally, plans to dub it from Ocean Media caused a dispute that lead the voice-actor's union SAG-AFTRA to issue a do-not-work order for the series. However, on September 26, 2022, the first 25 dubbed episodes were released in the United Kingdom on the BBC's iPlayer.

Video games
During Jump Festa '20, a video game based on the series has been announced. Dragon Quest: The Adventure of Dai - Xross Blade, an arcade game with collectible trading cards was released in Japanese arcades on October 22, 2020.Dragon Quest The Adventure of Dai: A Hero’s Bonds, a smartphone RPG for iOS/Android was released worldwide on September 28, 2021. Dragon Quest: The Adventure of Dai - Infinity Strash, an action RPG for an unannounced console is in development. 

Dai appears as a playable character in the 2019 video game Jump Force, marking the first appearance of a Dragon Quest character in a Weekly Shōnen Jump crossover game.

ReceptionDragon Quest: The Adventure of Dai is one of Weekly Shōnen Jumps best-selling manga series of all time, with more than 47million copies in circulation by 2019. The series also had a total estimated circulation of approximately 2billion copies in Weekly Shōnen Jump magazine between 1989 and 1996. On TV Asahi's Manga Sōsenkyo 2021 poll, in which 150.000 people voted for their top 100 manga series, Dragon Quest: The Adventure of Dai'' ranked 30th.

Notes

References

External links
 Official Shueisha Dragon Quest: The Adventure of Dai website 
 Dragon Quest: The Adventure of Dai (1991) official anime website at Toei Animation 
 Dragon Quest: The Adventure of Dai (2020) official anime website 
 

1989 manga
1991 anime films
1991 anime television series debuts
2020 anime television series debuts
Adventure anime and manga
Anime television series based on video games
Dragon Quest
Fantasy anime and manga
Manga based on video games
Muse Communication
Shōnen manga
Shueisha manga
Square Enix franchises
Toei Animation films
Toei Animation television
TBS Television (Japan) original programming
TV Tokyo original programming
Viz Media manga
Works based on Square Enix video games